"The Final Hour" is a single by the Canadian country music artist Hank Smith. The song debuted at number 45 on the RPM Country Tracks chart on March 20, 1971, and peaked at number 1 on June 5, 1971.

Chart performance

References

1971 singles
Hank Smith (singer) songs
1971 songs
Quality Records singles
Songs written by Dick Damron